The 2004 Grand Prix motorcycle racing season was the 56th F.I.M. Road racing World Championship season. The season consisted of 16 races, beginning with the South African motorcycle Grand Prix on 18 April 2004 and ending with the Valencian Community motorcycle Grand Prix on 31 October.

Season summary

MotoGP class

At the end of 2003, HRC and Valentino Rossi had parted ways, and HRC held Rossi to the letter of their contract which stipulated he could not ride another manufacturer's machine until 31 December 2003. Rossi's move to Yamaha, therefore, was a gamble on a manufacturer that hadn't had won a world championship in 12 years. Rossi won the first round of the season and lay to rest doubts about whether the rider or the motorcycle was more important when he achieved what no rider since Eddie Lawson had done in the history of the premier-class: he won back-to-back championships on different machines, Honda in 2003 and Yamaha in 2004.

Runner-up Sete Gibernau gave Rossi a strong challenge initially, but faded towards the end of the season. The friendship between him and Rossi frayed over the season, and snapped completely at the Qatar round.

Another change in 2004 was also d'Antin Team, who switched their alliance from Yamaha to Ducati motorcycles after five-year alliance with Yamaha, marked the first time Ducati MotoGP manufacturer introduced a satellite customer team.

At the Italian round, the race ran for 17 laps before rain started, and according to the rules at the time, the race was decided on a second, 6-lap race and the previous 17 laps only counted for grid positions. Conditions dried enough that the riders started the new race in slicks instead of wet-weather tires. In 2005 the rules were changed so that rain would no longer stop a race in MotoGP.

The Rookie of the Year was Rubén Xaus.

250cc class
The 250cc title was won by Daniel Pedrosa on a Honda.

125cc class
The 125cc title was won by Andrea Dovizioso on a Honda.

2004 Grand Prix season calendar
On 19 August 2003, the FIM released the initial 2004 calendar. In it, both the Japanese and the Pacific GPs were originally scheduled to take place. On 24 October 2003, the FIM confirmed the 2004 calendar. In it, the Japanese GP at Suzuka had been scrapped and was moved to Motegi and the all-new Qatar GP were to be held on a Saturday. On 16 December 2003, changes were made to the calendar. The date of the British GP was moved from 11 to 25 July and the date and day of the Rio GP were moved from Saturday 31 July to Sunday 4 July.

The following Grands Prix were scheduled to take place in 2004:

 †† = Saturday race

Calendar changes
 The Japanese Grand Prix moved from the Suzuka Circuit to the Twin Ring Motegi after the fatal accident of Japanese rider Daijiro Kato.
 The Japanese Grand Prix was moved back, from 6 April to 18 September.
 The Pacific Grand Prix was renamed the Japanese Grand Prix after the relocation to the Twin Ring Motegi.
 The Qatar Grand Prix was added to the calendar.

Regulation changes
The following changes are made to the regulation for the 2004 season:

Sporting regulations
 Restrictions have been introduced for testing. It is forbidden to test any bike between the fifteenth of one year and fifteenth of January of the next year, both dates being inclusive. This restriction counts for all teams in all three the classes who participated in the previous seasons as well as the teams that have been accepted to participate in the next season. The restriction applies to the testing of any bike used in any class of the FIM Road Racing World Championship Grand Prix with riders who are submitted for the Championship, or test riders.

 The end of a practice session will be designated by the waving of a chequered flag after which the exit of the pit lane will be closed. The time of a rider continues to be recorded until time has run out, after which a red light will be shown on the start line. After the chequered flag is out, all riders are allowed to compete one additional lap before they have to enter the pits.

 The grid positions will be changed. From now on, the grid will consist out of a singular row with three bikes compared to the previous four, sorted in a diagonal echelon formation. This change will only count for the MotoGP class, the 125 and 250cc classes will maintain the old four-row format. Each line will be offset and there must be a distance of nine metres between each row. If any rider delays the start, he may be penalised with a fine, a ride through penalty, disqualification or a withdrawal of championship points.

 During the race, the rider will be asked to ride through the pits, to which he may rejoin the race afterwards. Each rider must respect the speed limit, which is 85 km/h plus 10% according to Article 1.21.14. In case of a speed limit breach, a ride through will be issued and if a rider breaks the speed limit again, the black flag will be shown. If a race is restarted, this regulation will also be applied. If a race is interrupted before the penalty is enforced, and if there is a second part, the rider must take the ride through after the start of the second part of the race. In case a rider carries forward a penalty for anticipation of the start into the second part of an interrupted race and is subsequently found to have anticipated said second start, the rider will be shown a black flag and disqualified. After the team is notified, a yellow board (100 cm horizontal X 80 cm vertical) will be shown at the finish line displaying the rider's number (black colour, height 50 cm, stroke width 10 cm). This information will also be shown on the timekeeping monitors. If the rider fails to take the ride through after the board is shown to him three times, the rider will be shown a black flag and disqualified. If more than one rider is penalised, the riders will be instructed to take a ride through on the subsequent laps. The order of the riders will be based on the qualifying times where the faster rider goes first. If a rider fails to respond to instructions of the ride through and there multiple riders penalised, no rider will be signalled to take a ride through until the previous rider has completed the procedure or if he has been shown the black flag. If the organisation is unable to execute the ride through penalty before the end of the race, the penalised rider will get a time penalty of 20 seconds.

 New rules have been introduced regarding the behaviour of riders during practice runs as well as the race. All riders must obey the flag and light signals, as well as the boards which show instructions. Any infringement of this rule will then be penalised according the rules of Article 1.22. Riders must also ride in a responsible way, preventing danger to other competitors or participants either on the circuit or in the pits. If a rider breaks this rule, he will be penalised with a fine, a ride through, disqualification, a withdrawal of championship points or a suspension. Furthermore, riders are only allowed to use the circuit and the pits. However, if a rider accidentally leaves the track, he is allowed to rejoin it at the indicated place by the marshalls or at a specific place that does not give the rider an advantage. Any infringement of this rule during either the practice or warm-up will be penalised by the cancellation of the lap time and during the race by a ride through penalty. Other penalties such as a fine, disqualification or a withdrawal of championship points may also be imposed.

 New rules have been created for the flags and lights which are used to provide information. A blue flag waved at a flag marshall post indicates to a rider that he is about to be passed. During the practice sessions, the rider must keep his line and slow down gradually to allow a faster rider to pass him. If a rider is about to be lapped during the race, he must allow the following rider(s) to pass him at the earliest opportunity. Any infringement of this rule will be penalised via a fine, disqualification or a withdrawal of championship points. The blue flag will be shown waved to a rider who leaves the pit lane if traffic is approaching on the track at all times.

 If a yellow flag is waved at a flag marshal post, it indicates that there is a danger ahead. The rider must slow and be prepared to stop if needed. All overtaking is forbidden up to the point where the green flag is shown. Any infringement of this rule during a practice session will result in the cancellation of the lap time. If a rider breaks this rule during the race, he will be penalised with a ride through penalty. In both cases, other penalties such as a fine or suspension may also be imposed. If a rider realises he committed an infraction immediately after having overtaken someone, he must raise his hand and let the rider(s) past. If this happen, no penalty shall be issued.

 If a practice session or race is interrupted, the red flag will be waved at each flag marshal post and the red lights around the track will be switched on. All riders must adhere to the flags and lights and return slowly to the pits. When the pit exit is closed, the flag will be shown motionless at the exit and the light will be switched on. During this time, riders are forbidden to exit the pits. Any infringement of this rule will be penalised with a fine, disqualification, a withdrawal of championship points or a suspension. At the end of every practice and warm-up session, the red lights will be switched on at the start line. The red flag will be shown motionless on the starting grid at the end of the sighting lap(s) and at the end of the warm-up lap. The red flag may also be used to close the circuit. The red lights will be switched on at the start line for between two and five seconds to start each race.

 The flag is used to transfer instructions to a specific rider and is displayed motionless at each flag marshal post, together with the rider's number. The rider must stop at the pits at the end of his current lap and is not allowed to restart. This flag will only be shown after the rider's team has been notified. Any infringement of this rule will be penalised with a fine, disqualification, a withdrawal of championship points or a suspension. 

 The black flag with orange disk is used to transfer instructions to a specific rider and is displayed motionless at each flag marshal post, together with the rider's number. This flag informs the rider that his motorcycle has mechanical problems which could endanger himself or others around him and therefor must leave the circuit immediately. Any infringement of this rule will be penalised with a fine, disqualification, a withdrawal of championship points or a suspension. 

 New rules have been created for the interruption of a race. In the 125 and 250cc classes, if the calculated results show that two-thirds of the original race distance have been completed by the race leader and all other riders on the same lap as the leader, the race will be considered as completed and full championship points will be handed out. For the MotoGP class, the race will be restarted later on for a minimum of five laps according to Article 1.26. If it's not possible to restart the race, the race will be considered as completed and full championship points will be handed out.

 Rules have been introduced to clarify the distribution of championship points and possible problems that could arise in the classification. In the event of a tie in the distributed number of points, the final positions will be decided on the basis of the number of best place finishes in the races (number of first places, number of second places and so on). If there is still a tie, the date in the championship at which the highest place was acquired will be used with precedence going to the latest results.

 The penalties which will be handed out to riders are as follows: warnings, fines, ride through penalties, time penalties, disqualification, withdrawal of championship points, suspensions and exclusions.

 The following penalties may be given out by the Race Direction: a warning, fine, ride through penalty, time penalty, disqualification, withdrawal of championship points or suspension. Furthermore, if needed, the Race Direction can refer the cases to the International Disciplinary Court (CDI) to impose a higher penalty than the Race Direction is allowed to.

 The riders are not permitted to lodge an appeal against a decision of the Race Direction to impose a ride through penalty.

 All decisions of the Race Direction or of the FIM stewards must be notified directly at the event venue or, failing that, addressed by a registered letter with an acknowledgement of receipt. All judgements of the CDI mut be notified via a registered letter with acknowledgement of receipt in order to inform all the involved parties. 

 The disciplinary or arbitration body handing out a penalty or deciding on a protest or appeal must have its findings published and quote the names of all involved parties. Every person who is quoted in these statements have no right of action against either the FIM or the person who published the statement. The final decisions will be published by the Media Centre and the official FIM magazine unless the Court itself decides differently.

 Changes have been made to the payment of fines and costs. If a penalty is definitive, all fines must be paid into the Benevolent Fund before the start of the first practice of the second race following the final decision. The fine must be paid to the FIM Executive Secretariat within thirty days of notice of the judgement decision according to Article 3.5.5. The rider who is affected by the decision will be automatically suspended from participating in all FIM activities until the full payment has been received.

 A new FIM Anti-Doping Code has been set up and will come into force on 1 July 2004. 

This rule was additionally added on the 27th of March 2004:

 While riders can enter the pits during the race, taking the bike inside the pit box is not allowed. Infringement of this rule will result in a disqualification. Refuelling is also strictly forbidden. Working in a pit box is permitted during breaks, but only if the race is interrupted.

Technical regulations

 All classes will be changed. From now on, they will be designated by the engine capacity. The 125cc class will have its capacity changed from 80cc to 125cc with a maximum of one cylinder, the 250cc class will have its capacity changed from 175cc to 250cc with a maximum of two cylinders. The MotoGP class two-stroke bikes will have its capacity changed from 350cc to 500cc with a maximum of four cylinders and the four-stroke bikes will have its capacity changed from 350cc to 990cc with an unlimited amount of cylinders. All the four-stroke motorcycles who participate in the MotoGP class must be prototypes. Those that are not entered by a member of the MSMA must be approved for participation by the Grand Prix Commission. 

 All fuel lines from the fuel tank to the engine/carburetor must have a self-sealing breakaway valve, with the exception of the case when a fuel tank is fixed on the chassis with bolts. The valve must be separated at less than 50% of the load which is required to break any part of the fuel line or fitting, or to pull it out of the fuel tank.

 The fuel tank capacities for all prototype motorcycles are a maximum of 32 litres for two-stroke engines and a maximum of 24 litres for four-stroke engines. This fuel tank capacity for four-stroke engines will be further reduced to 22 litres from 2005 onwards.

These rules were additionally added on the 27th of March 2004:

 Rules have been created to clarify the minimum weights of the MotoGP four-strokes. If a bike has three cylinders or less, the minimum weight has to be 138 kg. If a bike has three cylinders or less with an oval piston, the minimum weight has to be 148 kg. If a bike has either four or five cylinders, the minimum weight has to be 148 kg. If a bike has four or more cylinders with an oval piston, the minimum weight has to be 158 kg. If a bike has six cylinders or more, the minimum weight has to be 158 kg.

 To remove the variable element of the weight of any remaining fuel, all 125cc and 250cc bikes will be weighed without the fuel tanks for which a 2 kg allowance will be made.

2004 Grand Prix season results

 †† = Saturday race

Participants

MotoGP participants

250cc participants

125cc participants

Standings

MotoGP riders' standings
Scoring system
Points were awarded to the top fifteen finishers. A rider had to finish the race to earn points.

 Rounds marked with a light blue background were under wet race conditions or stopped by rain.
 Riders marked with light blue background were eligible for Rookie of the Year awards.

250cc riders' standings

Scoring system
Points were awarded to the top fifteen finishers. A rider had to finish the race to earn points.

 Rounds marked with a light blue background were under wet race conditions or stopped by rain.
 Riders marked with light blue background were eligible for Rookie of the Year awards.

125cc riders' standings
Scoring system
Points were awarded to the top fifteen finishers. A rider had to finish the race to earn points.

 Rounds marked with a light blue background were under wet race conditions or stopped by rain.
 Riders marked with light blue background were eligible for Rookie of the Year awards.

Constructors' standings
Scoring system
Points were awarded to the top fifteen finishers. A rider had to finish the race to earn points.
 

 Each constructor gets the same number of points as their best placed rider in each race.
 Rounds marked with a light blue background were under wet race conditions or stopped by rain.

MotoGP

250cc

125cc

Teams' standings
 Each team gets the total points scored by their two riders, including replacement riders. In one rider team, only the points scored by that rider will be counted. Wildcard riders do not score points.
 Rounds marked with a light blue background were under wet race conditions or stopped by rain.

MotoGP

References

 
Grand Prix motorcycle racing seasons
2004 in motorcycle sport